Cansel is a Turkish word, and it may refer to:

Given name
Cansel Deniz (born 1991), Kazakhstani taekwondo athlete
Cansel Elçin (born 1973), Turkish actor

Surname
Feri Cansel (1944–1983), Turkish Cypriot actress. 
Zümrüt Cansel (born 1963), Turkish Cypriot actress